University of Fighting in Düsseldorf (UFD Gym) is a professional martial arts gym situated in German city Düsseldorf. Gym was founded by Dijaković brothers, Ivan and Tomislav - in 2013. It quickly became successful. In 2016 they were voted the best MMA Gym in Germany by the German martial arts portal GNP1.de. In 2017 UFD Gym was voted as "the best gym of the year in Germany" by the German web portal GFN (German Fight News).

UFD Gym features professional fighters who have competed in promotions such as the Ultimate Fighting Championship (UFC), Konfrontacja Sztuk Walki (KSW), Professional Fighters League (PFL) and Final Fight Championship (FFC). It also features professional boxer such as World Boxing Association heavyweight champion Manuel Charr or European EBU heavyweight champion Agit Kabayel.

UFD Gym also offers membership classes to children and adults in Boxing, Brazilian jiu-jitsu, Kickboxing, Muay Thai, Submission Grappling, Wrestling, MMA and Crossfit. Gym also hosted some fighting events such as West German GEMMAF Championship in 2018. or Elite MMA Championship in 2017.

Notable students 

 Hector Lombard
 Thiago Silva
 Roberto Soldić
 Erko Jun
 David Zawada
 Martin Zawada
 Abus Magomedov
 Hatef Moeil
 Antun Račić
 Ugur Ozkaplan
 Fabiano Silva da Conceicao
 Geard Ajetovic
 Manuel Charr
 Agit Kabayel
 Ercan Tuncel
 Damir Beljo 

Loik Radzhabov

Awards
2016 The best fighting gym in Germany
2017 The best gym in Germany

References

External links
 

Brazilian_jiu-jitsu_training_facilities
Mixed_martial_arts_training_facilities
Sport_in_Düsseldorf
2013_establishments_in_Germany